Wild Boys is an Australian television period drama series that began airing on the Seven Network on 4 September 2011. It is produced by Julie McGauran and Sarah Smith from Southern Star and John Holmes. The series is set in and around the fictional town of Hopetoun and principally filmed in Wilberforce on the Hawkesbury, Nelson, and Glenworth Valley on the New South Wales Central Coast. The series premiered in the UK on TCM UK on 3 March 2013.

The series was not renewed for a second season due to low viewership.

Plot
The pilot episode establishes the character of Jack Keenan and his friend Dan Sinclair, bushrangers in 1860s' colonial New South Wales. Their robberies target those travelling by horse and cart as they usually carry with them a large amount of valuables. One such robbery attempt proves to be unsuccessful and another bushranger, Hogan, (who is usually at heads with the morals of Jack and Dan) assists them but lets his identity slip.

One of the victims of this robbery is the new Police Superintendent of Hopetoun, Francis Fuller and he wants to kill Jack and Dan at any cost. Jack returns to the town and stays at the inn owned and run by Mary Barrett with whom he has a relationship. Mary however is angry at Jack as he hasn't been back for about three months. Fuller searches the town for Jack and Dan and almost catches them at the inn, but does catch and kills Hogan who he recognised from the robbery. Fuller ambushes Jack and Dan on another robbery attempt and they are captured.

On the way to their trial at court Fuller plans to kill Jack, Dan and an innocent farrier Conrad Fischer who is arrested under the pretence that he stole a horse. He wishes to eliminate Conrad as he knows that Emelia Fife, the mayor's daughter has feelings for Conrad and Fuller too likes her. When the three men realise that they are about to be killed, they escape from the cart, hijack the horses and ride off. In order to pay for new guns they decide to rob the Hopetoun police station of the police payroll.

Conrad refuses to help them claiming that he is not a bushranger and will not take part in criminal activities but when he sees that they are in trouble he creates a diversion and saves them. Hence the boys decide to give him a part of their earnings and he decides to go try his luck with the Gold Rush and heads off away from town as it is now unsafe to return. Emelia is informed by Francis that Conrad has been killed and she is distraught and knows that Francis accused him due to his anger that she rejected him. However Conrad later visits her before departure and they both admit their feelings for each other and Conrad tells her that he will return for her and will try and strike it rich at the gold mines.

Dan too decides to take a break for a few days and meet up later with Jack. Jack heads off to another family house who offer him a place to stay and a warm meal however later that night he hears screaming only to see the head of the family killed and as he walks out to take a look he is shot and knocked out by a masked figure.

Cast

Series overview

Episodes

References

External links
 
 Wild Boys on 7plus

Seven Network original programming
Australian drama television series
2011 Australian television series debuts
2011 Australian television series endings
Television series by Endemol Australia
Television shows set in New South Wales
Television shows set in colonial Australia
English-language television shows